ARBS may refer to: 
AN/ASB-19 Angle Rate Bombing System – an avionics weapon system
Angiotensin II receptor blockers – a group of pharmaceuticals
Associate of the Royal British Society of Sculptors (Since 2014 replaced by MRBS)